The South West Africa Territorial Force (SWATF) was an auxiliary arm of the South African Defence Force (SADF) and comprised the armed forces of South West Africa (now Namibia) from 1977 to 1989. It emerged as a product of South Africa's political control of the territory which was granted to the former as a League of Nations mandate following World War I.

History and background

From 1966 until 1989, South African security forces waged a long and bitter counterinsurgency conflict against indigenous nationalists in what was then South West Africa, represented by the Marxist South West African People's Organisation (SWAPO) and its military wing, the People's Liberation Army of Namibia (PLAN). As the guerrilla war intensified, however, it became clear that the local civilian police alone were not enough to cope with SWAPO/PLAN incursions and escalating unrest. Consequently, military units were deployed for the first time; 60,000 South African combat troops were engaged in South West Africa by the late 1970s.

Establishment
As part of a general policy of military and social reform, Pretoria initiated the establishment of local defence and police agencies for its protectorate beginning in 1977.

Structure and activation
A start was also made with the regrouping of existing units into four formations: 

 a Formation Headquarters Staff, 
 a Reaction Force (conventional), 
 an Area Force (Territorial) and 
 an Air Wing.

As regarding the latter, the South African Air Force would remain responsible for aerial operations although provision was made for an air commando squadron consisting of private and commercially qualified air crews. Their main function was to assist the South African Air Force in reconnaissance and communication flights and to provide operational officers for the operational service.

The new South West African Territorial Force was officially created on 1 August 1980, from South West African citizens already serving with the South African Defence Force.

Operationally, the SWATF was further divided into a Permanent Force infantry component, logistic/administrative divisions, a training wing, and a Citizen Force, which included at least three motorised infantry battalions. The 'permanent force' comprised mostly volunteer auxiliaries and national servicemen, who formed eight battalions. A militia system was also developed for local security, including over twenty 'area protection units'.

By 1981, SWATF's total strength numbered some 10,100 men, organised into both tribal-based battalions (including separate units for Ovambo, Herero, and Coloured ethnic groups) and multiethnic units partially manned by at least 10,000 white South West African personnel.

By 1987, SWATF had an estimated 22,000 troops, including additional units of engineers, signals personnel, mounted troops, a parachute battalion, and a commando squadron.

Training
A school cadet program similar to that in South Africa was developed for South West Africa.

Primarily all SWATF members received their initial training at 2 SA Infantry Battalion at Walvis Bay, (considered South African territory at that stage).

Advanced training, NCOs and Officer development however occurred at the SWA Military School at Okhandja.

Supervision
For all practical purposes, SWATF remained firmly integrated into existing SADF command structures. Its primary goal was protection of the territory of SWA from SWAPO incursions. The SWATF was placed under the control of the Department of Defence for South West Africa and was always headed by a SADF general. There was also a joint SWATF/SADF committee established for "planning, liaison, and coordination" efforts.

Uniform, rank structure, corps emblems, proficiency and ops badges
The first major step in the establishment of an independent territorial defence force in SWA was the introduction of a new nutria uniform on 6 September 1979 through which SWA units could be distinguished from SADF units.

Ranks
The rank structure of the SWATF was identical to that of the SADF. The insignia however differed considerably.

Commanders

Tactical breakdown

Headquarters Formation

The Reaction Force

Brigade

 Reaction Force Brigade, mainly a Citizen and cross corps force, 91 Brigade had a motorised sub-brigade composing two (later three) infantry battalions, an armoured car regiment, and an artillery regiment. The Brigade also included a training battalion and a mobilisation center. 

 Logistics Brigade

Battalions

 Eight full-time battalions
 31 Bushman Battalion (became 201 Battalion) HQ at Omega Base, 
 32 Battalion at Buffalo, 
 33 Eastern Caprivi Battalion, (became 701 Battalion) 
 34 Kavangoland Battalion, (became 202 Battalion)
 35 Ovamboland Battalion,  (became 101 Battalion) The Quick reaction force.
 36 Bushman Battalion, (became 203 Battalion) 
 37 Kaokoland Battalion, (became 102 Battalion) 
 41 Multi-ethnic Regiment Windhoek (became 911 Battalion) (As 911 Battalion – it became known as "Swing Force" due to its ability to operate as a conventional unit or as a Counter-insurgency (COIN) unit. It recruited from South West Africa at large and deployed predominantly as a reserve force. An infantry element, a mechanised contingent, artillery, and a regiment of Eland armoured cars was included. The unit was never mobilised en masse.

SWATF Special Forces
Although SWATF relied heavily on South Africa's special forces, over time it developed its own capability.

1 SWA Recon Regiment: started out as a sub unit under the command of the Commanding General SWATF in 1982, staffed mainly by ex South African operators.
 Front-line Recon Wings: most front-line battalions, such as 31, 36 and 101 also had their own Recon Wings.

 1 SWA Specialist Unit:  at Otavi – containing trackers, dogs, horses and dirt bikes. By 1984, 1 SWA SPES was based at Omaruku and at Omathoni together with 32 Battalion's Recce Wing.
 1 SWA Parachute Battalion: By 1987, 1 SWA Parachute Battalion and 32 Battalion's Recce Wing were amalgamated to become 2 SWA Specialist Unit or 2 SWA SPES and relocated to Luipersvallei, Windhoek.

The Area Force

South West African Military Operations Sectors
By 1979, South West Africa was subdivided into Operational Sectors. Three Frontline Sectors, 10, 20 and 70 fell under direct control of the South Africa Defence Force's South West Africa Command. Four additional Sectors, 30, 40, 50 and 60 covered the rest of South West Africa and was commanded directly by SWATF officers from 1980.

Frontline Sectors

Frontline Sectors were used for the massing of forces in preparation for external operations into Angola, acting as a buffer with the rest of the territory and reaction to immediate threats.

Although theoretically under control of the Area Force, due to their proximity to Angola the vast majority of conventional forces was based in these areas and remained under the direct control of South West Africa Command, a SADF regional command.

Sector 10 
(Kaokoland and Owambo) – HQ Oshakati

 SADF's 51 Battalion at Ruacana, 
 SADF's 52 Battalion at Oshakati, 
 SADF's 53 Battalion at Ondangwa,  
 SADF's 54 Battalion at Eenhana, 
 101 Battalion at Ondangwa and
 102 Battalion at Opuwa,

Combined SADF and SWATF forces in Sector 10

 SADF's Air Force Base Ondangwa,
 SADF's 5 Maintenance Unit at Ondangwa, 
 SADF's Sector 10 Training Unit at Oshivelo,

 SADF's Sector 10 Signals Unit at Oshikati,
 SADF's Sector 10 Maintenance Unit at Oshikati,
 SADF's Sector 10 Provost Unit at Oshikati, 
 SADF's 25 Engineering Squadron at Oshakati, and
 SADF's 61 Mechanised Battalion Group at Omuthiya (although not SWATF, 61 Mech had its origins in South West Africa)

Sector 20
(Kavango and Western Caprivi) – HQ Rundu

 SADF's 55 Battalion at Nepara. 
 32 Battalion at Buffalo. 
 201 Battalion at Omega base, 
 202 Battalion at Rundu and 
 203 Battalion at Mangeti.

Special Service Companies for quick reaction
These frontline Sectors also had immediate reaction forces (Special Service Companies) to deal with any attack and were primarily infantry company strength and fully motorised.

 905 SSC was based at Nepara in Sector 20 and deployed on Buffels.
 906 SSC was based at Omahoni in Sector 20 and deployed on Buffels. Local Kwanyama troops made up the bulk of the personnel.

SADF units in Sector 20
 SADF's Air Force Base Rundu and
 SADF's 6 Maintenance Unit at Rundu.

Sector 70
(Eastern Caprivi) – HQ Mpacha
Encompassed the Eastern Caprivi covering the Zambian border from Cuado to the Zambezi River.
 SWATF 701 Battalion, at Mpacha with attached SWATF armoured car and artillery battery.

SADF units in Sector 70
 SADF's Air Force Base at Mpacha,
 SADF's Navy Marine Company utilized for river patrols, and
 SADF's 9 Maintenance Unit at Mpacha.

Countrywide Sectors
Apart from the Frontline Sectors, four additional Sectors existed. 26 Area Force Units, similar to the South African commando system, was established for these less vulnerable parts of the territory.

Sector 30 
HQ Otjiwarongo (Citadel).

 301 Bn at Otjiwarongo. 

SWATF Otjiwarongo AME (Area Force Unit – Area Mag Eenheid), Outjo AME, Grootfontein AME, Tsumeb AME, Herreroland AME, Ethosa AME, Otavi AME, Damaraland AME and UIS PL. Its area of responsibility was likewise the Grootfontein, Tsumeb, Otavi, Outjo, Otjiwarongo, Hereroland and Damaraland regions.

SADF Units in Sector 30
 SADF's Air Force Base Grootfontein
 SADF's Northern Logistics Command at Grootfontein comprising:
 NLC 101 Workshop
 NLC Provost Unit
 NLC 6 Signals Unit
 NLC 16 Maintenance Unit

Sector 40
HQ Windhoek.

SWATF Alte Feste AME, Khomas AME, Hochl AME, Okahandja AME, Omaruru AME, Swakopmund AME, Rehoboth AME, Katatura AME and Khomasdal AME.

Other Units in this Sector:

 Regiment Windhoek

 1 SWA Provost Unit

Sector 50 
HQ Gobabis.

SWATF Aranos AME, Auob AME, Bo-Nossob AME, Aminius PL, Gobabis AME, Rietfont AME, Mariental AME and Maltahohe AME.

Sector 60
HQ Keetmanshoop.

SWATF Karasburg AME, Keetmanshop AME, Hoop AME, Bethanien AME, Oranjemund AME, Luderitz AME and Namaland AME.

Air Wing

Aircrews
While the SWATF relied heavily on the South African Air Force for combat and heavy logistics transportation, it did have its own Air Wing, which consisted mainly of civilian aircraft.

1 SWA Commando Squadron was established as 112 Air Commando on 24 September 1963 in Windhoek. The unit was staffed by volunteer civilian aircraft. From 1968, control of 112 Commando squadron passed from the SA Army to the SAAF and it was transferred to Light Aircraft Command. 
In 1970, it was disbanded, but in 1980 it was re-established as part of the SWATF.

Medical Command

Equipment

Small arms

Vehicles

Armoured
 Buffel APC/MRAP
 Casspir APC/MRAP
 Eland Mk7 Armoured Car 
 Wolf APC manufactured by Windhoeker Maschinenfabrik

Soft-skinned
 Samil 20
 Samil 50
 Samil 100
 Kwêvoël 100

Counterinsurgency

A lot of effort was used to interdict insurgent groups that had crossed over the Angolan border. These Insurgents were on foot, but knew the land and moved fast. There have been stories of the insurgents moving incredible distances with little supplies, whilst being chased and if cornered putting up a good resistance to their followers. Adrenaline injections were found at some of the incident scenes after a fire fight.

These insurgents were normally stalked by using trained trackers, who directed the reaction force. In some instances a stopper group was choppered in to cut off the insurgents before they reached the border.

Demobilisation

Under UN resolution 435, the United Nations Transition Assistance Group was mobilised, while SWATF was demobilised, its strength in the last years of operation was at about 22,000. Special arrangements were made for two San units of SWATF, as they originated from local tribal communities. They were thus allocated land near their previous bases.

All citizen force units were demobilised.

The SWATF was completely demobilised on 1 June 1989.

Withdrawal of some units to South Africa

UN Resolution 435 additionally called on South Africa to reduce its forces in Namibia to 12,000 before the start of any peace process and finally to 1,500 by 1989. Several thousand former SWATF members, especially from the San people who feared reprisals or intimidation, left for South Africa with the withdrawing SADF.

32 Battalion, whose members to a large extent could not claim Namibian citizenship, also withdrew to South Africa completely.

See also
 Koevoet
 Namibian Defence Force
 South West African Police (SWAPOL)

References

Further reading
 Overview of the rank insignia used by SWATF
 Military operations carried out by SWATF from 1975 up to its disbandment
 The SADF, A Survey. Supplement to the Financial Mail July 10, 1987 Introducing the SWATF.
 Wolfgang Reith: Die Südwestafrikanischen Territorialstreitkräfte SWATF 1980–1989, Namibia 2015, 

 
Armies by country
Military units and formations of the Cold War
Military units and formations of South Africa in the Border War
Military units and formations established in 1977
Military units and formations disestablished in 1989